EQT is a petroleum and natural gas exploration and pipeline company.

EQT may also refer to:

 EQT Partners a Swedish private equity group
EQT Ventures, the venture capital arm of EQT Partners
 EQT Plaza, formerly CNG Tower and Dominion Tower, a distinctive skyscraper in Pittsburgh, Pennsylvania
 Mercedes-Benz EQT, an electric van